A phene is an individual genetically determined characteristic or trait which can be possessed by an organism.

Phene may also refer to:
 Phène, a historical name for benzene, proposed by Auguste Laurent
 John Samuel Phene, British architect
 The Phene, a pub in Chelsea, designed by the above
 Phene (mythology), queen in Greek mythology